In mathematics, a noncototient is a positive integer n that cannot be expressed as the difference between a positive integer m and the number of coprime integers below it. That is, m − φ(m) = n, where φ stands for Euler's totient function, has no solution for m.  The cototient of n is defined as n − φ(n), so a noncototient is a number that is never a cototient.

It is conjectured that all noncototients are even. This follows from a modified form of the slightly stronger version of the Goldbach conjecture: if the even number n can be represented as a sum of two distinct primes p and q, then

It is expected that every even number larger than 6 is a sum of two distinct primes, so probably no odd number larger than 5 is a noncototient.

For even numbers, it can be shown

Thus, all even numbers n such that n+2 can be written as (p+1)*(q+1) with p, q primes are cototients.

The first few noncototients are

10, 26, 34, 50, 52, 58, 86, 100, 116, 122, 130, 134, 146, 154, 170, 172, 186, 202, 206, 218, 222, 232, 244, 260, 266, 268, 274, 290, 292, 298, 310, 326, 340, 344, 346, 362, 366, 372, 386, 394, 404, 412, 436, 466, 470, 474, 482, 490, ... 

The cototient of n are
0, 1, 1, 2, 1, 4, 1, 4, 3, 6, 1, 8, 1, 8, 7, 8, 1, 12, 1, 12, 9, 12, 1, 16, 5, 14, 9, 16, 1, 22, 1, 16, 13, 18, 11, 24, 1, 20, 15, 24, 1, 30, 1, 24, 21, 24, 1, 32, 7, 30, 19, 28, 1, 36, 15, 32, 21, 30, 1, 44, 1, 32, 27, 32, 17, 46, 1, 36, 25, 46, 1, 48, ... 

Least k such that the cototient of k is n are (start with n = 0, 0 if no such k exists)
1, 2, 4, 9, 6, 25, 10, 15, 12, 21, 0, 35, 18, 33, 26, 39, 24, 65, 34, 51, 38, 45, 30, 95, 36, 69, 0, 63, 52, 161, 42, 87, 48, 93, 0, 75, 54, 217, 74, 99, 76, 185, 82, 123, 60, 117, 66, 215, 72, 141, 0,  ... 

Greatest k such that the cototient of k is n are (start with n = 0, 0 if no such k exists)
1, ∞, 4, 9, 8, 25, 10, 49, 16, 27, 0, 121, 22, 169, 26, 55, 32, 289, 34, 361, 38, 85, 30, 529, 46, 133, 0, 187, 52, 841, 58, 961, 64, 253, 0, 323, 68, 1369, 74, 391, 76, 1681, 82, 1849, 86, 493, 70, 2209, 94, 589, 0, ... 

Number of ks such that k-φ(k) is n are (start with n = 0)
1, ∞, 1, 1, 2, 1, 1, 2, 3, 2, 0, 2, 3, 2, 1, 2, 3, 3, 1, 3, 1, 3, 1, 4, 4, 3, 0, 4, 1, 4, 3, 3, 4, 3, 0, 5, 2, 2, 1, 4, 1, 5, 1, 4, 2, 4, 2, 6, 5, 5, 0, 3, 0, 6, 2, 4, 2, 5, 0, 7, 4, 3, 1, 8, 4, 6, 1, 3, 1, 5, 2, 7, 3, ... 

Erdős (1913-1996) and Sierpinski (1882-1969) asked whether there exist infinitely many noncototients. This was finally answered in the affirmative by Browkin and Schinzel (1995), who showed every member of the infinite family  is an example (See Riesel number). Since then other infinite families, of roughly the same form, have been given by Flammenkamp and Luca (2000).

References

External links 
 Noncototient definition from MathWorld

Integer sequences